Curt Bromm is a politician from the U.S. state of Nebraska. He served as Speaker of the Nebraska Legislature from 2003 to 2004.

Bromm was born on March 19, 1945, in Oakland, Nebraska. He graduated from high school in Tekamah, Nebraska, as well as the University of Nebraska-Lincoln and the University of Nebraska-Lincoln College of Law. Bromm was an officer in the United States Army and is an acolyte at his local Roman Catholic church.

Bromm was a member of the Legislature from 1993 to 2005 and was Speaker from 2003 to 2004. Additionally, he was the Saunders County, Nebraska Attorney. In 2004, he was an unsuccessful candidate in the Republican primary for the United States House of Representatives from Nebraska's 1st congressional district, losing to the eventual general election winner Jeff Fortenberry.

References

People from Oakland, Nebraska
People from Wahoo, Nebraska
Republican Party Nebraska state senators
Nebraska lawyers
Speakers of the Nebraska Legislature
United States Army officers
University of Nebraska College of Law alumni
1945 births
Living people
2004 United States presidential electors